Serhiy Oleksandrovych Popov (born 22 April 1971 in Makiivka) is a former footballer from Ukraine. He is the highest scoring defender of the Ukraine national football team.

Career
Popov is a graduate of the Donetsk sports school of Olympic reserve and started to compete at senior level at age of 17 playing for the Novator Mariupol (Zhdanov). After being drafted to the army, he defended colors of SKA Kiev and FC Nyva Vinnytsia in 1990–91.

After the fall of the Soviet Union Popov signed with Shakhtar Donetsk of the Ukrainian Premier League, with which he stayed until 2004. In the mid 90s he also spend couple of seasons for the Russian Zenit Saint Petersburg. Before retiring in 2006 Popov played for Metalurh Zaporizhia.

International career
The hard-nosed defender was also a regular member of the Ukraine national football team from 1993 to 2003, having appeared in 54 international matches and notching 5 goals.

Career statistics

International goals

References

External links
 

1971 births
Living people
Sportspeople from Makiivka
Association football defenders
Soviet footballers
Ukrainian footballers
Ukraine international footballers
FC CSKA Kyiv players
FC Mariupol players
FC Zenit Saint Petersburg players
FC Shakhtar Donetsk players
FC Metalurh Zaporizhzhia players
Ukrainian expatriate footballers
Expatriate footballers in Russia
Ukrainian Premier League players
Russian Premier League players
FC Nyva Vinnytsia players
Ukrainian football managers
Ukrainian expatriate sportspeople in Russia
FC Shakhtar-3 Donetsk managers